Kenneth Albert Weafer (February 6, 1913 – June 4, 2005) was a Major League Baseball pitcher who played in one game in 1936 with the Boston Bees. He batted and threw right-handed. On May 29, 1936, he pitched 3 innings in relief surrendering 6 hits, 4 earned runs, walking 3, and struck out none, as the Bees lost to the New York Giants at the Polo Grounds.

During World War II, Weafer served in the United States Navy.

Weafer was born in Woburn, Massachusetts, to Margaret E. Sullivan and Jeremiah F. Weafer (1862–1949), a barber, and died in Guilderland, New York. He is the brother of American League umpire Hal Weafer. He is also second cousin once removed to the South African artist Jeremy Wafer, and second cousin twice removed to English footballer Graham Knight.

References

External links

1913 births
2005 deaths
Boston Bees players
Major League Baseball pitchers
Baseball players from Massachusetts
Birmingham Barons players
Toledo Mud Hens players
Columbia Senators players
Louisville Colonels (minor league) players
Albany Senators players
Duke Blue Devils baseball players
People from Woburn, Massachusetts
People from Guilderland, New York
Burials at St. Agnes Cemetery